Beth Walker may refer to:

Beth Walker (judge), Justice of the West Virginia Supreme Court of Appeals
Beth Walker in 2010 Trofeo Abarth 500 GB season
Beth Walker, fictional character played by Amy Madigan

See also
Elizabeth Walker (disambiguation)